The arcuate popliteal ligament is an Y-shaped extracapsular ligament of the knee. It is formed as a thickening of the posterior fibres of the joint capsule of the knee.

It has its origin at the posterior aspect of the head of the fibula. It has two insertions: the medial limb arches superficially over the tendon of the popliteus muscle to blend with the oblique popliteal ligament; the lateral limb passes to the lateral epicondyle of the femur (accompanied by the popliteus muscle tendon) to blend there with the lateral head of the gastrocnemius muscle.

References

External links
 
  - "Major Joints of the Lower Extremity: Knee Joint"

Ligaments of the lower limb